Alexander Manufacturing Company Mill Village Historic District is a national historic district located at Forest City, Rutherford County, North Carolina.  It encompasses 87 contributing buildings in a predominantly residential section of Forest City developed by the Alexander Manufacturing Company.  The mill village developed after 1918, and includes notable examples of Colonial Revival and Bungalow / American Craftsman style architecture. Landscape architect Earle Sumner Draper’s planned the curvilinear village plan. Notable buildings include the Alexander Manufacturing Company mill complex, former Alexander School, and Alexander Baptist Church.

It was added to the National Register of Historic Places in 2008.

References

Forest City, North Carolina
Historic districts on the National Register of Historic Places in North Carolina
Colonial Revival architecture in North Carolina
Buildings and structures in Rutherford County, North Carolina
National Register of Historic Places in Rutherford County, North Carolina